The Employment Agency Standards Inspectorate is a division of the Employment Relations Directorate, part of the Department for Business, Enterprise and Regulatory Reform, which is meant to oversee employment agencies operating in the United Kingdom. It takes complaints and investigates breaches of the Employment Agencies Act 1973 and the Conduct of Employment Agencies and Businesses Regulations 2003 (SI 2003/3319).

Accounts
According to the Minister for Employment in 2005, the Inspectorate has the following resources,

2002–03, budget expenditure £659,000
 12 regionally based Inspectors
 3 Managers also with inspection powers
 5 Helpline staff (to receive complaints, advise and answer worker and agency questions)
	
2003–04, budget expenditure £581,000
 12 regionally based Inspectors
 3 Managers also with inspection powers
 4 Helpline staff (to receive complaints, advise and answer worker and agency questions)
	
2004–05, budget expenditure £566,000
 12 regionally based Inspectors
 3 Managers also with inspection powers
 4 Helpline staff (to receive complaints, advise and answer worker and agency questions)
	
It carried out 1,054 investigations in 2004 and convicted 8 people for breaching the Employment Agencies Regulations (see the Employment Agencies Act 1973), all in the entertainment industry. There are over 17,000 private recruitment agencies in the UK, representing an industry turnover in excess of £25 billion a year.

See also
UK agency worker law
Gangmasters Licensing Authority
Employment Act 2008

Notes

External links
DBERR consultation on the NMWA 1998 and the EASI
Written answer from minister on Hansard, 23.06.2004, col. 1455W
Written answer from minister on Hansard, 5.07.2005, col. 284W

United Kingdom labour law
Employment agencies of the United Kingdom